Hunstanton Cliffs is a  biological and geological Site of Special Scientific Interest in Hunstanton in Norfolk. It is a Geological Conservation Review site.

These eroding cliffs expose a mid-Cretaceous sequence from the Albian to the succeeding Cenomanian around 100 million years ago, with exceptionally rich Albian ammonite fossils. Biological interest is provided by a colony of breeding fulmars on the cliff face.

There is public access to the beach.

References

Sites of Special Scientific Interest in Norfolk
Geological Conservation Review sites